Ottawan is a French pop music duo, who had the hit singles "D.I.S.C.O." and "Hands Up (Give Me Your Heart)" in the early 1980s. Fronted by Patrick Jean-Baptiste, the band were masterminded through a cooperation between French producer Daniel Vangarde and Belgian producer Jean Kluger.

History
In 1979, Ottawan was founded by record producers Daniel Vangarde and Jean Kluger and fronted by male singer Patrick Jean-Baptiste, who was originally from Guadeloupe, and female singer Annette Eltice. Kluger and Vangarde had also scored hits with The Gibson Brothers and Sheila B. Devotion.

In the United Kingdom, they had two Top 10 hits. "D.I.S.C.O." (the act's debut single) reached number 2 in September 1980, while "Hands Up (Give Me Your Heart)" peaked at number 3 a year later. "Hands Up (Give Me Your Heart)" reached number 1 in New Zealand during 1982, staying there for eight weeks. The duo recorded in French as well as English.

Cover versions
The duo's hits have been covered a number of times.

Canadian band Sway had a #7 hit in Canada in 1988 with their cover of "Hands Up (Give Me Your Heart)".

Norwegian band  had a #10 hit in Norway and #7 hit in Finland in 1995 with their cover of "Hands Up".

Swedish band Army of Lovers had a #44 hit in Sweden in 2001 with their cover of "Hands Up".

Israeli band The Young Professionals had a #53 hit in France in 2012 with their version of "D.I.S.C.O.".

Discography

Albums

Singles

Citations

External links
 
 

Eurodisco groups
French dance music groups
French disco groups
French musical duos
Disco duos
Carrere Records artists
RCA Victor artists
PolyGram artists
Polydor Records artists
Mercury Records artists
Male–female musical duos